The 1993 World Junior Ice Hockey Championships (1993 WJHC) was the 17th edition of the Ice Hockey World Junior Championship and was held in Gävle, Sweden.  Canada won the gold medal, its sixth championship, while Sweden won silver, and the combined team of the Czech Republic and Slovakia won bronze. Peter Forsberg of Sweden scored a tournament record 31 points, while teammate Markus Näslund's 13 goals also set a tournament record.

Final standings
The 1993 tournament was a round-robin format, with the top three teams winning gold, silver and bronze medals respectively.  As the tournament was ongoing, the nation of Czechoslovakia was dissolved into two separate nations, the Czech Republic and Slovakia, on New Years Day, 1993. The team remained unified throughout the tournament, however the Czechoslovakian flag and anthem were replaced with the flag and anthem of the International Ice Hockey Federation on January 1.  Meanwhile, the former Soviet Union, which had competed in 1992 as the Commonwealth of Independent States was replaced in this tournament by Russia.

Japan was relegated to Pool B for 1994.

Results

Scoring leaders

Tournament awards

Pool B
Eight teams contested the second tier this year in Lillehammer and Hamar Norway from December 27 to January 5.  It was played in a simple round robin format, each team playing seven games.
Standings

Switzerland was promoted to Pool A and the Netherlands was relegated to Pool C for 1994.

Qualification for Pool C
Nine countries played a qualification tournament from November 10 to 15, for a spot in the C Pool.  Five teams played in Riga Latvia while the remaining four played in Minsk Belarus, with the first place teams playing each other in Riga.  Greece was the only competitor who was not making their debut.

Riga Group

Minsk Group

Qualification Game

 won the right to participate in Pool C.

Pool C
Eight teams were divided into two round robin groups, with placement games to follow (1st played 1st, etc.).  The tournament took place from December 30 to January 3, in Odense and Esbjerg Denmark.

Preliminary round
Group A

Group B

Placement Games
7th place: 13 - 2 
5th place: 4 - 2 
3rd place: 15 - 4 
1st Place: 8 - 3  was promoted to Pool B for 1994.''

References

External links
pre-tournament interview with Peter Forsberg and Markus Näslund at SVT's open archive 

World Junior Ice Hockey Championships
World Junior Ice Hockey Championships
World Junior Ice Hockey Championships
World Junior Ice Hockey Championships
Sports competitions in Gävle
Sports competitions in Falun
Sports competitions in Uppsala
Sport in Hamar
Sport in Lillehammer
World Junior Ice Hockey Championships
World Junior Ice Hockey Championships
Sport in Odense
Sport in Esbjerg
International ice hockey competitions hosted by Sweden
International ice hockey competitions hosted by Norway
International ice hockey competitions hosted by Denmark